Laura Thorpe (born 24 May 1987) is a French former tennis player.

On 6 June 2011, she achieved a career-high singles ranking of world No. 161. On 28 April 2014, she peaked at No. 86 in the doubles rankings. In her career, she won two singles and 16 doubles titles on the ITF Circuit.

In 2013, Thorpe played her first WTA Tour final at the Luxembourg Open alongside Kristina Barrois, which they lost against Yanina Wickmayer and Stephanie Vogt.

WTA career finals

Doubles: 1 (runner-up)

ITF Circuit finals

Singles: 8 (2 titles, 6 runner-ups)

Doubles: 24 (16 titles, 8 runner-ups)

External links
 
 
 

1987 births
Living people
French female tennis players